Badurtala is a village of Patharghata Upazila in Barguna District in the Barisal Division of southern-central Bangladesh.

References

Populated places in Barisal District